Wilson Island is a bar island on the Kanawha River in Charleston, West Virginia. I-64's bridge over the Kanawha River into the city crosses over the island.

See also 
List of islands of West Virginia

River islands of West Virginia
Islands of Kanawha County, West Virginia
Kanawha River